Kaynazar (Qainazar) is a village in Almaty Region, in south-eastern Kazakhstan.

Notable people
Quddus Khojamyarov (1918–1994), composer

References

Populated places in Almaty Region